The 2015–16 Maltese Second Division started in September 2015 and ended in May 2016. Msida Saint-Joseph F.C., Kirkop United F.C. and Żurrieq F.C. were relegated to the Maltese Third Division. Marsa F.C., Sirens F.C. and Gharghur F.C. were promoted to the Maltese First Division.

Marsa were crowned champions in the last game against Gharghur as they win 2–1, and Sirens lost the Derby against Mgarr United and handed the cup to the champions Marsa.

Participating teams 
 Birzebbuga St.Peters
 Sirens F.C.
 Mellieha
 Mgarr United
 Marsa F.C.
 Gharghur F.C.
 Msida St. Joseph's F.C.
 Swieqi United F.C.
 St. Patrick
 Kirkop United F.C.
 Zejtun Corinthians
 Zurrieq
 Qrendi F.C.
 Siggiewi F.C.

Final league table

Maltese Second Division seasons
3
Malta